is a passenger railway station located in Kanazawa-ku, Yokohama, Kanagawa Prefecture, Japan, operated by the private railway company Keikyū.

Lines
Nōkendai Station is served by the Keikyū Main Line and is located 37.4 kilometers from the terminus of the line at Shinagawa Station in Tokyo.

Station layout
The station consists of two elevated opposed side platforms with the station building located underneath.

Platforms

History
It was relocated to its present address and rebuilt as an elevated station in 1969. A new station building and bus terminal were completed on December 1, 1982, and the station renamed to its present name at that time.

Keikyū introduced station numbering to its stations on 21 October 2010; Nōkendai Station was assigned station number KK48.

Passenger statistics
In fiscal 2019, the station was used by an average of 30,365 passengers daily.

The passenger figures for previous years are as shown below.

Surrounding area
 Kanagawa Cardiovascular and Respiratory Disease Center
Yokohama Quarantine Station Nagahama Measures Station
Tomioka Junior High School, Nokendai Elementary School,

See also
 List of railway stations in Japan

References

External links

Railway stations in Kanagawa Prefecture
Railway stations in Japan opened in 1944
Keikyū Main Line
Railway stations in Yokohama